Sister Ray is the stage name of Ella Coyes, a Métis singer-songwriter. They were born and raised in Sturgeon County, Alberta. Their debut full-length album Communion was released in May 2022 on Royal Mountain Records, and was longlisted for the 2022 Polaris Music Prize.

Coyes previously released the EP Untitled in 2017.

References

Living people
Canadian indie rock musicians
Canadian singer-songwriters
Canadian LGBT singers
Métis musicians
Musicians from Alberta
Non-binary singers
People from Sturgeon County
21st-century Canadian singers
Year of birth missing (living people)
21st-century Canadian LGBT people